Wigry National Park is a national park in Podlaskie Voivodeship in north-eastern Poland. It covers parts of the Masurian Lake District and Augustów Primeval Forest (Puszcza Augustowska). It is named after lake Wigry, the largest of the park's many lakes. It is also classed as a Ramsar wetland site, one of 13 such sites in Poland.

The park was created on January 1, 1989, on an area of 149.56 km2. Strictly protected zones account for 6.23 km2, including 2.83 km2 of woods. The park has its headquarters in the town of Suwałki.

The park’s landscape was to a large extent shaped by a glacier which covered this region around 12,000 years ago. The glacier, while slowly receding to the North, formed valleys, many of which are filled with water in the form of lakes. Some of the shallowest lakes have in the course of time become peat-bogs. Northern part of the park is hilly, with elevation reaching 180 meters above sea level. Southern part, on the other hand, is flat and is mainly covered with a forest, which is part of the broader Puszcza Augustowska.

The park is famous for its numerous lakes, which are of different shape, size and depth. Altogether, there are 42 of them, the biggest, Wigry, covering the area of 21.87 km2 with maximum depth of 73 meters, is located in central part of the park. The main river is Czarna Hańcza, which crosses Lake Wigry, and forms a popular kayaking route.

History

The first attempts to protect the nature of Lake Wigry and its surrounding area were undertaken in the 1920s – first by Kazimierz Kulwieć and later by the botanist Bolesław Hryniewiecki and the limnologist Alfred Lityński – but never came to fruition. Their activities, however, led to the creation of a hydrobiological station on the shores of the lake in Płociczno. It was active until the outbreak of World War II in 1939. The first protected area, a partial reserve named “Wigry”, was established in 1931. Two other reserves, “Ostoja Bobrów Stary Folwark” (Stary Folwark Beavers’ Refuge) and “Ostoja Bobrów Zakąty” (Zakąty Beavers’ Refuge), were established in 1959 and 1962 in order to protect beavers. In 1970, Lake Wądołek and a fragment of an adjacent forest became the first strict nature reserve in the area. In 1975, International Union for Conservation of Nature (IUCN) placed Lake Wigry on its list of the most valuable water reservoirs in the world (Project "Aqua").

Lobbying for the further protection of Lake Wigry eventually resulted in the establishment of Wigry Landscape Park in 1976, which covered an area of nearly 11,000 ha. Shortly after the establishment of the landscape park, work aiming at designation of a national park began, eventually resulting in the government’s decision to designate Wigry National Park in June 1988, with an area of 14,840 ha. The park officially began its activity on January 1, 1989. In 1997, the area was increased to 15,085 ha.

In 2002, Wigry National Park was inscribed on the Ramsar Convention list of wetlands of international importance. It became a part of the Natura 2000 network in 2004.

Wildlife

Animals

Over 1,700 animal species have been found in the park, including 46 species of mammals, 202 species of birds, 12 species of amphibians and 5 species of reptiles. The most characteristic animal living in the park is European beaver, numerous in lakes and rivers. Currently there are around 250 beavers there. Also, sometimes one can meet a wolf. In Park’s waters thrive 32 species of fish. For some animals, Wigry National Park is the only place to live. 289 species are protected by law and 128 of them have been placed on the Red List of Endangered Species in Poland.

Plants

Interesting is the fact that in the park there is not a single specimen of beech tree. On the other hand, predominant tree type is the fir which is present in all forests. The Park’s area is to a large extent covered by peat bogs, which are in some places of pristine character.

Tourism

Northeastern Poland, including the park itself, is an attractive region for tourism, especially in the summertime. There are more than 190 kilometres of tourist trails in the park. Fishing anglers as well as sailboats take advantage of the biggest lakes including Wigry, Pierty, Leszczewek and Mulaczysko.

The places of interest include a former monastery, where an artist residency belonging to the Ministry of Culture is located.

See also
 Augustów Canal

References

External links
 Official website at www.wigry.win.pl
 The Board of Polish National Parks

National parks of Poland
Parks in Podlaskie Voivodeship
Protected areas established in 1989
Ramsar sites in Poland
1989 establishments in Poland
Suwałki County
Central European mixed forests